Francisco González (born 18 May 1936) is a Colombian footballer. He played in three matches for the Colombia national football team in 1963. He was also part of Colombia's squad for the 1963 South American Championship.

References

External links
 

1936 births
Living people
Colombian footballers
Colombia international footballers
Association football forwards
Sportspeople from Antioquia Department